Paraleprodera insidiosa is a species of beetle in the family Cerambycidae. It was described by Francis Polkinghorne Pascoe in 1888, originally under the genus Leprodera. It is known from India, Myanmar, Malaysia, Laos, Taiwan, Cambodia, and Thailand. It contains the varietas Paraleprodera insidiosa var. unimaculata.

References

Lamiini
Beetles described in 1888